Radioactive ores were first extracted in South Australia at Radium Hill in 1906 and Mount Painter in 1911. 2,000 tons of ore were treated to recover radium for medical use. Several hundred kilograms of uranium were also produced for use in ceramic glazes.

In 2019 Australia exported  of uranium, 12% of world production, for use in nuclear power generation. IAEA and the OECD's NEA reported that the price of uranium in 2019 was $130/kg, and estimated that 35% of the world's uranium resource reserves was in Australia (1,748,100 tonnes out of 4,971,400 tonnes). In terms of production, Kazakhstan is the largest supplier, followed by Canada and Australia.

Following the Japanese Fukushima nuclear disaster in early 2011, many countries scaled back their nuclear power production, with some setting deadlines for a complete shutdown of all nuclear power reactors, with a resultant impact on demand for uranium. As of 2013 uranium prices have been very low. New mine developments have received State government approval in Western Australia and Queensland, although it is unlikely that new projects will enter active development until the uranium market price improves.
 
For several decades uranium mining has been a major part of the Australian political discussion, with opposition groups citing the wide-ranging environmental impacts, indigenous land access and nuclear proliferation as reasons for ceasing or restricting the industry. The debate has resulted in limitations on mining and export activities, with Federal and State governments occasionally backflipping on public policy.

As of 2017, there were three operational uranium mine sites: Olympic Dam (BHP), Ranger (Energy Resources of Australia), and Beverley Four Mile (Heathgate Resources).

History

The occurrence of uranium in Australia had been known since the 1890s. Uranium was produced as a bi-product of radium mining in South Australia at Radium Hill from 1906 and Mount Painter from 1911. A refinery at Hunters Hill, Sydney processed the ore between 1911 and 1915 for radium bromide and uranium. The radium was used for medical research and the uranium used in ceramic and glass manufacture.

Serious uranium exploration started in 1944 after requests from the United States and United Kingdom governments, and in 1948 tax concessions were offered by the Commonwealth for successful discoveries. A£1.8 million uranium treatment complex operated by the Government of South Australia at Port Pirie commenced operations in August 1955, processing ore from Radium Hill and Wild Dog Hill (Myponga), south of Adelaide. The complex supplied the United Kingdom - United States Combined Development Agency and closed in February 1962.

Uranium deposits were found at Rum Jungle (NT) in 1949 and a mining operation run by the Commonwealth commenced there in 1954.  Further discoveries were made at South Alligator River (NT) in 1953, Mary Kathleen (Qld) in 1954, and Westmoreland (Qld) in 1956.  In 1954 Radium Hill reopened as a uranium mine and mining operations started at other sites in the late 1950s, including El Sherana, Coronation Hill and Palette.

By 1964, production had mostly ended due to depleted reserves and filled contracts. Export sales during this initial phase included 7,730 tonnes of uranium to the US and UK for their nuclear weapons programs. Much of the sales related to the power generation in overseas countries.

A second wave of exploration activity in the late 1960s occurred with the development of nuclear energy for electricity production.  60 deposits had been identified up to the late 1970s. The Ranger deposit was discovered in 1969, Nabarlek and Koongarra in 1970, and Jabiluka in 1971.

The first of many government inquiries into the industry was tabled in 1976 as the "Ranger Uranium Environmental Inquiry" (also known as the "Fox Report"), and addressed the question of whether Australia should mine and export uranium. Mining operations ceased while the inquiry was underway but recommenced in 1977 after the government took up a 42% share of Ranger Uranium Mines. In 1979 the Commonwealth sold its share in the still to be built Ranger operation and at the same time established Energy Resources of Australia to own and operate the mine. Ranger finally opened for production in 1981. The mine continued to operate until January 2021 and is now marked for remediation.

The Nabarlek (NT) mine operated for four months in 1979.  Milling of stockpiled ore commenced in 1980 and produced 10,858 tonnes of uranium oxide up to 1988 with sales to Japan, Finland and France, for civil power generation.

Mary Kathleen closed in late 1982 becoming the site of Australia's first major uranium mine site rehabilitation project. This was completed in 1985. A similar site rehabilitation project at Rum Jungle also took place in the 1980s.

The Olympic Dam mine at Roxby Downs started operations in 1988, operated by Western Mining Corporation. A large underground mine, it was mainly focussed on copper production, with uranium, gold and silver as by-products. Western Mining Corporation was taken over by BHP Billiton in 2005.

Historically, many prospective Australian uranium mines have been constrained by active antinuclear opposition, but state governments have now approved mine development in Western Australia and Queensland. But it is unlikely that any new projects will enter active development until the market improves. As of 2013 uranium prices are very low. Cameco placed the Kintyre project on hold until market prices improve and Paladin has stated that its project proposals (Bigrlyi, Angela/Pamela, Manyingee, Oobagooma, and Valhalla/Skal) need higher uranium market prices before they can proceed. Toro wants to take the Wiluna proposal to the development phase, but has not been successful in attracting equity investors. When market prices go up again, so that mine development is justified, most projects would need at least five years to proceed to production.

Map

Markets 
Generally, there is only one commercial use for uranium: as the source material for nuclear power generation.  In February 2009 there were 436 operational nuclear power plants worldwide, with a total generating capacity of nearly 372 gigawatts of electricity. Another 64 nuclear power reactors are expected to be commissioned over the next six years.

There are no nuclear power generation plants operating in Australia and therefore no domestic demand.  The High Flux Australian Reactor at Lucas Heights, New South Wales operated from 1958 to 2007. The OPAL research reactor is currently in operation at Lucas Heights.

Australian uranium is mined and sold only for electrical power generation or nuclear research, Almost all the uranium is exported under strict International Atomic Energy Agency safeguards.

Government policy and politics

Uranium mining in Australia has been highly political, particularly for the Australian Labor Party (ALP) at both state and federal level.  Development of projects has often been stymied by a succession of inquiries and the politicisation of the issuing of mining and export licences.

The biennial ALP National conference in 1982 debated the issue vigorously. At the 1984 Conference, the newly elected federal Labor government under Bob Hawke introduced the so-called "Three mine policy". The policy confined Australian uranium mining activities to the three sites already operational: Ranger, Nabarlek and Olympic Dam with a moratorium on new mines opening.  Subsequently, reserves at Nabarlek were depleted and the Beverley Uranium Mine became the notional third mine.

The coalition won the 1996 Federal election under John Howard and promptly abandoned the policy.

On 28 April 2007, the Howard government adopted a new uranium strategy which aimed to immediately remove "unnecessary constraints impeding the expansion of uranium mining, such as overlapping and cumbersome regulations relating to the mining and transport of uranium ore" and repeal prohibitions on further nuclear industrial development which had been established in 1999 under the Environment Protection and Biodiversity Conservation (EPBC) Act 1999.

The same day, the Labor party abandoned its "no new mines" policy, while maintaining its opposition to other forms of nuclear industrial development in Australia.

After returning to government in 2008, the ALP approved a fourth uranium mine in July 2009: the Four Mile uranium mine in South Australia, thus ending its 25-year-old policy. Federal Resources Minister Martin Ferguson subsequently declared that increased uranium mining in Australia was inevitable.

State governments opposed to uranium mining have been able to stop the issuing of mining permits, sometimes against the policy of the incumbent Federal government.  As of December 2015, the current position of the affected states and territories is as follows:
South Australia (ALP): supports mining
Western Australia (Lib/NP coalition): supports mining
Queensland (ALP): opposed to mining 
 New South Wales (Lib/NP): supports exploration, opposed to mining 
Northern Territory: under the control of the Commonwealth
 Victoria (Lib/NP): opposed to mining
 Tasmania (Lib/NP): supports mining

Recent legislative changes 
The Western Australian ban on uranium mining was removed in 2008.

Queensland's ban on uranium mining was revoked in 2012, when Premier Campbell Newman back-flipped on a pre-election promise. In March 2015 the Palaszczuk government announced that it would be reinstating the ban.

The New South Wales Government passed the Mining Legislation Amendment (Uranium Exploration) Act 2012 No 16 on 4 April 2012. The Act was proclaimed on 14 September 2012. The Act removed the ban on uranium exploration to help gain an understanding of what uranium and uranium-bearing mineral resources may exist in the State. The ban on uranium mining remains in place.

Opposition 

Opposition to uranium mining has been considerable in Australia, and notable anti-uranium activists have included Dr Helen Calidicott, Kevin Buzzacott, Jacqui Katona, Yvonne Margarula, and Jillian Marsh.

In November 2011, Prime Minister Julia Gillard called on the ALP to reverse its policy at the ALP national conference, to allow export of Australian uranium to India. India has not signed the nuclear non-proliferation treaty.

While being welcomed at the time by State and Federal governments as a major boost to the economy, the proposed Olympic Dam expansion of mining operations did attract criticism. In 2010, local traditional owners and Indigenous communities protested the proposed expansion. In July 2012, more than 400 people joined a "Lizard's Revenge march" to the Olympic Dam site. The anti-nuclear activists, including Elder Kevin Buzzacott, protested against the mine expansion and the uranium industry. They say the company and the government have put short-term economic gain ahead of environmental and health concerns. Organiser Nectaria Calan said police harassed protesters, demanding identification and controlling access to and from their campsite. In August 2012, BHP Billiton announced that the expansion was being postponed indefinitely pending investigation of a "new and cheaper design".

In 2016, BHP Billiton's asset president, Jacqui McGill, announced that the expansion plans would move ahead, "through low-risk, capital efficient underground expansions."

Regulation of uranium mining in Australia

Federal law
Mining or milling uranium ore is defined as a 'nuclear action' in Environment Protection and Biodiversity Conservation Act 1999, s.22(1)(d). This means that an EPBC Act approval is required for uranium mining from the Federal Environment Minister if a corporation or the Commonwealth or a Commonwealth agency is to take a nuclear action that has, will have or is likely to have a significant impact on the environment (s.21(1)).

State and Territory laws

NSW
Until 2012, the Uranium Mining and Nuclear Facilities (Prohibitions) Act 1986 (NSW) prohibited uranium mining in NSW. In 2012 the O'Farrell government proposed the repeal of selected provisions of this Act, by means of the Mining Legislation Amendment (Uranium Exploration) Bill 2012, which passed on 28 March 2012, and received Royal Assent on 4 April 2012. 
The UMNFP Act had made it an offence to prospect for, or to mine, uranium in NSW. (s.7) The 2012 Bill removed the general prohibition on prospecting for uranium in New South Wales. It also enables exploration licences and associated permits (but no other licences or authorities) to be granted under the Mining Act 1992 to prospect for uranium, to apply the State environmental planning policy applicable to other mineral exploration to uranium prospecting, vests all uranium in NSW in the Crown and excludes compensation for that vesting. 
The UMNFP Act still prohibits State authorities from constructing or operating nuclear reactors for the production of electricity (s.9).

Northern Territory

Queensland 
Mining uranium was banned in Queensland from 1989 to 2012. The ban was repealed by the Newman government, then the Palaszczuk government in 2015 announced that it would be reinstated.

South Australia
Radiation Protection and Control Act 1982 (SA) (ss. 5, 27).

Roxby Downs (Indenture Ratification) Act 1982 (see: Schedule)

On 19 March 2015 the South Australian government established The Nuclear Fuel Cycle Royal Commission to investigate the expansion of uranium mining and exploration of new uranium deposits in South Australia. On 15 November 2016 the government decided to support all five uranium mining related recommendations made by the commission.

Victoria
Nuclear Activities (Prohibitions) Act 1983 - s.5: Prohibition against exploration etc. for uranium or thorium

Western Australia
Uranium (Yeelirrie) Agreement Act 1978 see alsohttp://www.dmp.wa.gov.au/9997.aspx
Before the 2017 State election, former Western Australia's Environment Minister, Albert Jacob, gave approval for the Wiluna Project, owned by Toro Energy, the Yeelirrie Project owned by Cameco and the Mulga Rock Project owned by Vimy Resources. The WA McGowan government was elected in March 2017 and reinstated the ban on uranium mining but allowed these three and the Kintyre Project, owned by Cameco, to proceed.

Mines

About 96% of known resources are at six sites: Olympic Dam (the world's largest known uranium deposit), Ranger, Jabiluka, Koongarra, Kintyre and Yeelirrie.

Closed/depleted
Radium Hill
Nabarlek Uranium Mine
Rum Jungle Mine
Mary Kathleen mine

Operating
Olympic Dam mine 
Ranger Uranium Mine
Beverley Uranium Mine
Four Mile uranium mine
Honeymoon Uranium Mine

Known deposits/possible future minesites

Mount Gee uranium deposit
Jabiluka uranium deposit
Kintyre uranium deposit
Yeelirrie uranium project

See also

Anti-nuclear movement in Australia
Australian Uranium Association
Environmental issues in Australia
Fallout and Follow Me (1977 play)
Gavin Mudd
List of countries by uranium reserves
Nuclear industry in South Australia
Nuclear power in Australia
Supervising Scientist
Treaty on the Non-Proliferation of Nuclear Weapons
Uranium mining in Kakadu National Park
World Uranium Hearing

References

External links
Australian atlas of minerals resources, mines & processing centres
Australia’s uranium resources, geology and development of deposits Geoscience Australia
Australian Map of Nuclear and Uranium Sites